Sphingobacterium bambusae is a Gram-negative, non-spore-forming and non-motile bacterium from the genus of Sphingobacterium which has been isolated from soil from a bamboo plantation.

References

Sphingobacteriia
Bacteria described in 2010